Janata College, established in 1964, is a general degree college situated at Kabuganj, in Cachar district, Assam. This college is affiliated with the Assam University.

Departments

Arts
Bengali
English
Manipuri
Hindi
History
Economics
Philosophy
Political Science

Principals of the College
1) Late Sri Binod Behari Nath (Founder Principal)
2) Late Sri Subhas Chandra Nath
3) Late Sri Rajendralal Nath
4) Late Sri Sushil Chandra Dey
5) Late Sri Dilip Kumar Deb Mazumder
6) Dr. Sujit K Ghosh
7) Smt. Nandita Dutta Roy
8) Smt. Nivanani Devi
9) Dr. Suprabir Dutta Roy
10) Sri Subhas Chandra Nath

References

External links
http://janatacollege.in/

Universities and colleges in Assam
Colleges affiliated to Assam University
Educational institutions established in 1964
1964 establishments in Assam